Dilkrishna Shrestha   was born in Tinkhole-11, Bhimeshwor of Dolkha district, Nepal. His family later moved to Kathmandu. He has been a journalist, radio presenter, film actor, producer, writer, music director, lyricist and is now managing director of a film company.

Early life
Dil Krishna Shrestha was born on 21 February 1986, in, Tinkhole-11, Bhimeshwor, Dolkha, Nepal, to father Ram Bahadur Shrestha and mother Dila Maya Shrestha with 10 elder siblings. As a child he was fascinated by Hindi and Nepali films and was an avid listener of Nepali songs.

Film making
Dil Krishna Shrestha established a feature film production house called "Shrestha International Media and Corporate House Pvt " which has completed three films with another 2 set for pre-production. The films include: Timi Jaha Vaye Pani, Bullet, and Loot Company. 
As an actor, he has appeared in: Sikari,  Sikari 2, Tarjan, Dhunge Youg, and  Timi Jaha Bhaye Pani. He has also produced the films: Timi Jaha Bhaye Pani, Bullet and Srinagar which is in production. He also has credits as a film writer, music director and lyricist.

Awards 
He has won the following awards:
 Box office film Award
 NEFTA film Award
 D cine Award
 Dancer cine award

References

1986 births
Nepalese male film actors
Nepalese film producers
Living people
People from Dolakha District
Nepali radio presenters